Cotton candy is a form of spun sugar.

Cotton candy or Candy floss may also refer to:
Cotton Candy (film), a 1978 television movie directed by Ron Howard
Cotton Candy (single-board computer) by FXI Technologies
Cotton Candy grapes, a sweet hybrid variety of table grape
Cotton Candy Nebula, a protoplanetary nebula'
Candyfloss (novel), a novel by Jacqueline Wilson
Candy Floss (wrestler), Croatian-English professional wrestler

Music
 "Cotton Candy", song by horrorcore group Insane Clown Posse
Cotton Candy (album), an album by Al Hirt
Cotton Candy (band), resident band at the Cinnamon Club in the 1960s
Cotton Candy (instrumental), a 1964 instrumental by Al Hirt
Cotton Candy (Yungblud song)